Keystone is a small unincorporated community on Whidbey Island in Island County, Washington, in the northwestern United States. It is near the Coupeville Ferry Landing, a dock for the Washington State Ferries route to Port Townsend that provides a maritime link for State Route 20 across Admiralty Inlet. It is located about 3 miles due south of Coupeville near Fort Casey State Park and Ebey's Prairie National Historic Preserve.

References

Unincorporated communities in Island County, Washington
Unincorporated communities in Washington (state)